Riedstadt, with its municipal area of 73.76 km² is Groß-Gerau district's biggest town by land area. It lies in Hesse, Germany, about 12 km southwest of Darmstadt.

Geography

Location
Riedstadt is shaped not only by its preserved rural structure, but also by being near several cities, namely Frankfurt am Main, Darmstadt, Wiesbaden, Mainz, and Mannheim. As its name suggests, it lies in the Hessisches Ried, the northeastern section of the Rhine rift. The community practises the structured settlement of environmentally friendly business operations.

Local recreation sites near the community include the Kühkopf-Knoblochsaue nature reserve, the Bergstraße, the Odenwald, and the Taunus.

Neighbouring communities
Riedstadt borders in the north on the community of Trebur and the town of Groß-Gerau, in the east on the towns of Griesheim and Pfungstadt (both in Darmstadt-Dieburg), in the south on the town of Gernsheim and the communities of Biebesheim and Stockstadt am Rhein, and in the west on the communities of Ludwigshöhe and Dienheim as well as the town of Oppenheim (all 3 in Mainz-Bingen).

Constituent communities
Riedstadt consists of the centres Crumstadt, Erfelden, Goddelau, Leeheim, and Wolfskehlen.

History

Amalgamations
The community came into being on 1 January 1977 with Hesse's municipal reforms, which merged the formerly independent communities of Goddelau, Wolfskehlen (which had already merged voluntarily with Goddelau in 1973), Erfelden, Crumstadt, and Leeheim.

Erfelden
Erfelden was first mentioned in a donation document from the Lorsch Monastery in 779. In the Thirty Years' War, King Gustavus Adolphus of Sweden spent two nights at the mayor's house in 1631 while his troops were crossing the Rhine. His building master Matthäus Staud built the Schwedensäule ("Swedes' column") at Erfelden which recalls the crossing.

Goddelau

Goddelau was first mentioned in a donation document when Count Gundram donated his property "in Terminis Gotalohono" to Fulda Abbey. Over the centuries, the village was shaped by its dwellers' agricultural and handicraft activities. In 1588 there were roughly 180 inhabitants in Goddelau. The house in which writer and revolutionary Georg Büchner would later be born was built in 1665, and still stands today.

Leeheim
Leeheim was first mentioned in the Lorsch codex in 766 when a man named Dodo made a donation to the Lorsch Monastery. Near the earlier village of Camba, the Salian Conrad II was chosen to be German King in 1024. Leeheim was shaped by several monastic properties, belonging to, among others, St. Alban's Monastery in Mainz. The overlords were the Wolfskehlers, and later the Katzenelnbogen family. In 1536, Leeheim became Evangelical, and in the Thirty Years' War, more than 70% of the village was destroyed. In 1666, almost half the inhabitants lost their lives to the Plague.

In earlier times, Leeheim developed itself from a farming village into a workers' residential village with recreational lands on the Riedsee, a nearby lake, and a golf course.

Wolfskehlen
Wolfskehlen is Riedstadt's northernmost constituent community. It was first mentioned in the document Historia Episcopatus Wormatiensis in 1002 in which Emperor Heinrich II granted Bishop Burchard of Worms the rights in the Forest of Forehahi. In 1252, the Lords of Wolfskehlen, who had taken their name from the village, sold Neuwolfskehlen Castle to the Archbishop of Mainz. In 1539, Barbara von Wolfskehlen wed Eberhard von Gemmingen-Hornberg, who introduced the Reformation into Wolfskehlen. In 1579, the Mainz Palatinate (Kurmainz) ceded its rights to the Landgraves of Hesse. During the Thirty Years' War, and through the Plague, almost the whole population was killed; the reconstruction began in the 18th century. From 1868 to 1878, the building of the Mannheim–Frankfurt railway brought the dissolution of the village's purely agricultural structure. After the Second World War, the village absorbed about 800 refugees.

Population development
Each time at 31 December
1998 – 20,050
1999 – 20,393
2000 – 20,576
2001 – 20,805
2002 – 20,984
2003 – 21,167
2004 – 21,362
2005 – 21,707
2006 – 21.728
2011 – 21.597
2014 – 22.530
2015 – 23.289

Mayors
The mayor was since 1993 Gerald Kummer, SPD. He was reelected in 2005. In January 2011,  Werner Amend (independent) was voted as the new mayor. In November 2016 Marcus Kretschmann (CDU) was elected, who will come into office in April 2017.

Politics

Municipal council
Municipal council consists of 37 seats. At the last election on 6 March 2016, the seats were apportioned thus:
CDU 11 seats
SPD 14 seats
Linke 2 seats
GLR 4 seats
FW 6 seats

Town partnerships
Riedstadt maintains partnership links with the following places:
 Brienne-le-Château, France,  since 1979
 Sortino, Italy
 Tauragė, Lithuania

Notable people

 Georg Büchner (1813–1837), German writer and revolutionary
 Peter Reuter (born 1955), PhD in clinical biochemistry, MD, author of multiple medical dictionaries
 Guenther Roth (born 1931), sociologist, journalist, book author, leading American scholar on Max Weber

Sundry
In August 1984, the remains of an ice age mammal were unearthed at a gravel pit near Crumstadt. At first thought to be a mammoth, it later turned out on further analysis, specifically of the teeth, to be a young forest elephant. The bones are now in the Hessisches Landesmuseum Darmstadt.

References

External links
 

Groß-Gerau (district)